is a Japanese comedy manga written and illustrated by Tōru Seino. It was published in Kodansha's Monthly Morning Two from November 2014 to October 2015. and later in Morning from December 2015 to April 2018, with its chapters collected in five wide-ban volumes.

It was adapted into a mockumentary television series titled , broadcast on TV Tokyo and TV Osaka starting in April 2016.

Media

Manga
Sono 'Okodawari', Ore ni mo Kure yo! is written and illustrated by Tōru Seino. The series ran in Kodansha's Monthly Morning Two from November 21, 2014, to October 22, 2015. It was then transferred to Morning, where it ran from December 3, 2015, to April 5, 2018. Kodansha collected its chapters in five wide-ban volumes, released from June 23, 2015, to July 23, 2018.

Volume list

Cast
Mayu Matsuoka
Sairi Itō

References

Comedy anime and manga
Kodansha manga
TV Tokyo original programming
2016 Japanese television series debuts
Mockumentary television series
Seinen manga